Angelique Pettyjohn (born Dorothy Lee Perrins; March 11, 1943 – February 14, 1992) was an American actress and burlesque queen. She appeared as the drill thrall Shahna in the Star Trek: The Original Series episode "The Gamesters of Triskelion".

Acting career
Pettyjohn was born in Los Angeles, California, and raised in Salt Lake City, Utah. Her first credited film appearances were in 1967 under the name Angelique. They include The Touch of Her Flesh and The Love Rebellion. Her big break came that same year in the Elvis Presley film Clambake.

Pettyjohn was one of the go-go dancers in the opening scene of the comedy film The Odd Couple (1968), starring Jack Lemmon and Walter Matthau, and she also tested for the role of Nova in Planet of the Apes the same year (Linda Harrison accepted the role).

In 1968, Pettyjohn appeared in the Star Trek: The Original Series episode "The Gamesters of Triskelion" as Shahna, the thrall trainer of Captain James T. Kirk. She also appeared on other 1960s television series such as Mister Terrific; The Green Hornet; Batman; Love, American Style; The Girl from U.N.C.L.E.; and as male CONTROL agent Charlie Watkins (a "master of disguise" who is able to appear convincingly female) in two episodes of Get Smart: "Smart Fit the Battle of Jericho" and "Pussycats Galore" (1967).

In 1969, she starred in the horror film The Mad Doctor of Blood Island, appeared as Cherry in the biker film Hell's Belles, played a saloon girl in the Glenn Ford Western Heaven with a Gun, and starred in Childish Things, co-directed by John Derek.

Her 1970s films included Tell Me That You Love Me, Junie Moon (1970) starring Liza Minnelli, the sci-fi exploitation film The Curious Female (1970), and the low-budget crime drama The G.I. Executioner (1971) where she played a topless dancer. She played a stripping nun in the comedy film Good-bye, Cruel World (1983), and appeared in such cult classic features as The Lost Empire (1984), Repo Man (1984), Biohazard (1985), and Mike Jittlov's film The Wizard of Speed and Time (1989), where she played an assistant to a movie executive (and designed her own costumes).

During the early 1980s, she made use of her buxom figure in such hardcore adult films as Titillation, Stalag 69, and Body Talk (all 1982) under the pseudonyms Angelique, Heaven St. John, and Angel St. John.

Burlesque
During the 1970s, she worked as a burlesque star in Las Vegas. In 1970, she appeared in Barry Ashton's Burlesque Show at the Silver Slipper Gambling Hall and Saloon. She later was a featured showgirl in the Vive Paris Vive show at the Aladdin Hotel. She also was featured in the Maxim Hotel & Casino Burlesque Show, and in 1978 teamed with Bob Mitchell and Miss Nude Universe in "True Olde Tyme Burlesque" at the Joker Club.  She was photographed by Robert Scott Hooper for the February 1979 Playboy pictorial "The Girls of Las Vegas". 

Pettyjohn became quite popular at the Star Trek conventions and in 1979 Hooper photographed her in her costume from the episode "The Gamesters of Triskelion". They produced two posters, one in her complete costume and one nude without the costume that she sold at the conventions.

Death
On February 14, 1992, Pettyjohn died in Las Vegas, Nevada from cervical cancer at age 48.

Filmography

References

External links 
 
 
 
 Angelique Pettyjohn(aveleyman)

1943 births
1992 deaths
20th-century American actresses
Actresses from Los Angeles
American female erotic dancers
American erotic dancers
American film actresses
American television actresses
Deaths from cancer in Nevada
Deaths from cervical cancer
20th-century American dancers